Manikyakottaram is a 1966 Indian Malayalam film,  directed by U. Rajagopal and produced by H. H. Abdulla Settu. The film stars Madhu, Sharada, Kamalam and P. K. Sathyapal in the lead roles. The film had musical score by M. S. Baburaj.

Cast
Madhu
Sharada
Kamalam
P. K. Sathyapal
Baby Padmini
Bahadoor
K. P. Ummer
Nellikode Bhaskaran
Philomina
Suprabha

Soundtrack
The music was composed by M. S. Baburaj and the lyrics were written by Kaniyapuram Ramachandran.

References

External links
 

1966 films
1960s Malayalam-language films